Choirokoitia is a village in the Larnaca District of Cyprus, located 2 km north of Tochni, near the UN World Heritage Site of Choirokoitia.

References

Communities in Larnaca District